Flatspace is a video game developed by British studio Cornutopia Software and released for Microsoft Windows in 2003. The player assumes the role of a spaceship captain. The game use 3D graphics with a top-down view and combines features from space trading simulators and action role-playing games. Play is open-ended: activities available include trading, missions, exploration, bounty hunting, space piracy, and police work.

A sequel, Flatspace II: The Rise of the Scarrid, was released in 2005. A third installment in the series, Flatspace IIk: The Scarrid Dominion, was released in 2012.

Reception
Game Tunnel rated Flatspace 9.5 out of 10, and were impressed with the tracking of every individual ship, found the battle with different scale ships to be "exhilarating" and the varied, open-ended gameplay to be enjoyable.

References

Further reading
An Interview with Mark Sheeky about Flatspace by Game Tunnel

External links
Official website
FAQ

2003 video games
Video games developed in the United Kingdom
Windows games
Windows-only games
Space trading and combat simulators
Indie video games
2005 video games
2012 video games